Arnaud Bodart (born 11 March 1998) is a Belgian professional footballer who plays as a goalkeeper for Standard Liège in the Belgian First Division A.

Club career
Bodart made his professional debut in a 3–1 Belgian First Division A win over Waasland-Beveren on 16 May 2017.

Personal life
Bodart is the nephew of the Belgian former goalkeeper and international footballer Gilbert Bodart.

References

External links
 
 
 Standard Profile

1998 births
Living people
People from Seraing
Footballers from Liège Province
Belgian footballers
Association football goalkeepers
Belgium under-21 international footballers
Belgium youth international footballers
Belgian Pro League players
Standard Liège players